Leucadendron spissifolium, the spear-leaf conebush, is a species of plant in the family Proteaceae. It was first described in 1967.

Description
Leucadendron spissifolium is endemic to grasslands and shrublands of South Africa. The species is pyrophytic, and requires wildfires to disperse seeds. Flowers are dioecious and pollinated by insects.

Subspecies
There are five subspecies recognized under L. spissifolium.
Leucadendron spissifolium subsp. spissifolium (Common spear-leaf conebush)
Leucadendron spissifolium subsp. fragrans (Fragrant spear-leaf conebush)
Leucadendron spissifolium subsp. natalense (Natal spear-leaf conebush)
Leucadendron spissifolium subsp. oribinum (Oribi spear-leaf conebush)
Leucadendron spissifolium subsp. phillipsii (Kareedouwvlakte spear-leaf conebush)

References

spissifolium